Eric James Stone (born 1967) is an American science fiction, fantasy, and horror author. He won the 2004 Writers of the Future contest, and has published in Analog Science Fiction and Fact, InterGalactic Medicine Show, and Jim Baen's Universe.  His 2010 novelette, "That Leviathan, Whom Thou Hast Made," won the Nebula Award for Best Novelette and was a finalist for the Hugo Award.

He became the assistant editor for Orson Scott Card's InterGalactic Medicine Show in 2009, and served as web-host for Tangent Online. He received a degree in political science at Brigham Young University and went on to graduate from Baylor Law School.  Stone lives in Eagle Mountain, Utah.

Personal life
On November 21, 2012, Stone announced his engagement to Darci Rhoades.

Bibliography

Novels
Unforgettable (2011, self-published, picked up by Baen Books, January 2016)

Collections
Rejiggering the Thingamajig and Other Stories (Paper Golem, August 2011)

Short fiction

Awards

References

Further reading

External links
Author's website

1967 births
Living people
American Latter Day Saints
American male novelists
American male short story writers
American science fiction writers
American short story writers
Analog Science Fiction and Fact people
Nebula Award winners
People from Eagle Mountain, Utah